Patrick Eugene Ryan (born 1965) is an American novelist and short story writer. His books include The Dream Life of Astronauts and Send Me, as well as three novels for young adults: Saints of Augustine, In Mike We Trust, and Gemini Bites.

Life and career
Patrick Ryan was born in Washington, D.C., in 1965 and raised in Florida. He received his bachelor's degree in 1987 from Florida State University and his Master of Fine Arts in 1990 from the Writing Program at Bowling Green State University. He wrote short stories for about 10 years prior to the publication of his first book. His story "So Much for Artemis" earned him a National Endowment for the Arts in Fiction fellowship and was included in The Best American Short Stories 2006. His story "Getting Heavy With Fate" received the 2005 Smart Family Foundation Award for Fiction.

His first book was Send Me, a collection of linked short stories that looks at four decades in the life of a dysfunctional family. Celebrated author Edmund White compared Ryan's writing to that of John Cheever. The Bay Area Reporter called Send Me "a masterfully eventful novel..." while a reviewer at the Seattle Times said it was "a meticulously crafted, immensely satisfying piece of work."

Ryan followed up in 2008 with the young adult novel Saints of Augustine. Two best teenage friends, one gay and one not, struggle with family issues, drug abuse, divorce, dating, and a rupture in their friendship. In 2009, he published a second young adult novel, In Mike We Trust, which examines a young man's relationship with his hip, cool, con-artist uncle as the older man attempts to lure him into a life of charity scams. His 2011 novel, Gemini Bites, explores the world of a boy and girl who are fraternal twins, and their competition for the affections of a goth boy who comes to live for a short period of time with their family.

The Dream Life of Astronauts was published in July 2016. It is a collection of nine short stories set against the backdrop of Florida's space program from the late 1960s to the present.

For four years, Ryan worked as an editor at the literary magazine Granta. He is the current editor-in-chief of "One Story" and "One Teen Story".

Notes

1965 births
21st-century American novelists
American male novelists
Living people
Writers from Washington, D.C.
American male short story writers
21st-century American short story writers
21st-century American male writers